The Vickers Vigilant was a 1920 project to build a British 100-seat flying boat designed by Vickers for transatlantic and Australian flights.

Development and design
The flying boat was to be a biplane powered by eight Rolls-Royce Condor engines, each pair coupled to drive a shared tractor propeller. Its structure have been entirely duralumin. The project was cancelled and the flying boat was not built.

Specifications

References

Vigilant (1920)
Eight-engined tractor aircraft
Flying boats
Cancelled aircraft projects